Ughelli is a town in Delta State, Nigeria, and one of the 24 kingdoms that make up the Urhobo Nation. It also serves as the headquarters of Ughelli North local government area of Delta State. The city is indigenous to the Urhobo ethnic nationals, but there is a mixture of several other tribes from the country, such as the Igbos, Edos and others. It is an industrial and agricultural spot of Delta State.

Ughelli is in a central location in Delta State and a major town for the Urhobo Tribe, also one of the oldest kingdom in Delta State tracing back to the 14th and 15th century. The city of Ughelli is ruled by a traditional ruler which is known as Ovie, and is passed from father to son. The current king is His Royal Majesty, Oharisi III who lives in the Ovie Palace situated at Otovwodo-Ughelli.

History
Ughelli oral tradition has it that the great ancestor and founding father of Ughelli ("Ughene"), is the second son of Oghwoghwa (a Prince from Benin Kingdom). As history has it, Oghwoghwa in search of his own kingdom first settlement was at Tarakiri and later left for Oviri Ogor (current site of Ogor Techinal College). Ughene later left Oviri Ogor and founded Ovwodoawanre (Old Settlement), before the present settlement headquarters at Otovwodo (traditional headquarters).

Ughelli has several schools, a general hospital, and a local government secretariat. The city is a link between Delta North and Delta South. The city has crude oil and gas reserves hence the presence of Shell Petroleum Development Company (SPDC).

Ughelli town is the administrative headquarters of Ughelli North Local Government Area.

Location
Ughelli's latitude and longitude coordinates are: 5.500187, 5.993834. It is a city in southern Nigeria and the oldest kingdom of the 24 kingdoms of the Urhobo people

List of rulers of Ughelli Kingdom

Notable people
 Efe Abogidi
Efe Ajagba
Gamaliel Onosode
Ben Okri

References 

Populated places in Delta State